The Berlin Inn Restaurant and Bakery (or simply the Berlin Inn) was a German restaurant in Portland, Oregon.

Description
The restaurant operated in a "gasthaus" (converted house) at 12th Avenue and Powell in southeast Portland's Brooklyn neighborhood. Grant Butler of The Oregonian described the old house's interior as "cozy". The menu featured German cuisine and included cheese blintzes, fondue, rouladen, sauerbraten, sausages, schnitzel, and a crispy baked kale salad, as well as German beers and wines. Scrambles with homemade veal sausage were available on the brunch menu.

History
Karen Brauer was a co-owner of the Berlin Inn, which opened in 1992 and operated for 21 years. Todd Haynes frequented the restaurant.

In June 2013, Brauer confirmed plans to close and reopen under a new name, The Brooklyn House Restaurant, but retaining the same staff and European-style dining. The Berlin Inn closed on June 22. The restaurant's general manager Erica Litzner became a co-owner of Brooklyn House Restaurant (or simply Brooklyn House), along with Lisa Samuels. The duo had previously operated the business Eat Here Now Fresh Local Food together. The restaurant's menu featured dairy-free, gluten-free, and vegan "European-style" comfort food. Some former Berlin Inn employees worked at the Brooklyn House, which opened in August 2013. The aesthetic remained similar, according to Walker MacMurdo of Willamette Week.  By 2020, sushi chef Albert Chen had opened the restaurant Hamono Sushi in the house which was previously occupied by the Berlin Inn and Brooklyn House, following "a period of inactivity".

Reception
In 2016, Grant Butler included the Berlin Inn in The Oregonian list of "97 long-gone Portland restaurants we wish were still around", writing: "This Brooklyn neighborhood German restaurant was the place to go if you wanted sausages and schnitzel without a side order of singing waiters and Deutschland kitsch."

See also
 List of defunct restaurants of the United States
 List of German restaurants

References

External links

 The Berlin Inn at Zomato

1992 establishments in Oregon
2013 disestablishments in Oregon
Brooklyn, Portland, Oregon
Defunct European restaurants in Portland, Oregon
Defunct German restaurants in the United States
German restaurants in Portland, Oregon
Restaurants disestablished in 2013
Restaurants established in 1992